Phoradendron bolleanum, commonly called Bollean mistletoe, is a species of plant in the sandalwood family that is native to the desert southwest, California and southern Oregon in the United States.

It is a hemiparasite found on trees in the genera Juniperus and Arbutus.

References

Flora of North America
Santalaceae